Santiago "Sonny" Cabatu Sr. (born October 10, 1960) is a Filipino retired professional basketball player in the Philippine Basketball Association and was the first draft pick of the league in 1985. He is also the father of current Philippine Patriots player Junjun Cabatu. He also played for the Cagayan de Oro Nuggets and Pasig-Rizal Pirates in the Metropolitan Basketball Association.

Amateur career
Cabatu started his basketball career at the University of Northern Philippines from 1977-1979. Later in 1979, he transferred to the University of Baguio where as a UB Cardinal, he was recruited by Coach Nic Jorge to play for Masagana 99 in 1980. During his stint with M-99, Sonny also enrolled at PSBA and played for the Jaguars in the MUCAA. From Masagana, he has played for Filsyn and Presto in the MICAA. In 1982, he was a member of Crispa's Paul Jordan team under coach Nat Canson, which won the Interclub basketball crown. 

In 1984, Cabatu was part of the Development Bank of Rizal team that won the championship of the PABL Ambassador's Cup. After Bank of Rizal disbanded, Sonny went to the national team selection, coached by Larry Albano and sponsored by Country Fair Hotdogs, which competed in the Jones Cup tournament in Taipei. He joined ESQ Marketing midway in the PABL second conference and Sonny made history by winning the Most Valuable Player (MVP) award twice in a row with ESQ capturing the second and third conference championships.

National team career
Cabatu has been a national player twice with the Philippine team to the 1982 Asian Games in New Delhi, India, coached by Nat Canson, and the 1983 Southeast Asian Games in Singapore under coach Larry Albano.

PBA career
Being the professional league's first-ever number one draft pick in 1985, Cabatu was a starting center for newcomer Shell Azodrin. He became a journeyman throughout his pro career, moving to Great Taste and then to Purefoods after three seasons with Shell. In 1990, he was taken by expansion franchise Pop Cola from the expansion pool. Cabatu was traded to Ginebra in 1992 and played four seasons with the ballclub. He was signed by Purefoods as a temporary replacement for the injured Reuben dela Rosa in the 1997 PBA season and at age 36, he finally won his first PBA championship after 12 seasons as the Purefoods Corned Beef Cowboys captured the All-Filipino crown that year.

References

1960 births
Living people
Barangay Ginebra San Miguel players
Basketball players from Ilocos Sur
Centers (basketball)
Filipino men's basketball players
Great Taste Coffee Makers players
Ilocano people
Magnolia Hotshots players
People from Ilocos Sur
Philippine Basketball Association All-Stars
Pop Cola Panthers players
Power forwards (basketball)
Shell Turbo Chargers players
University of Baguio alumni
PSBA Jaguars basketball players
Shell Turbo Chargers draft picks